Kyiv National I. K. Karpenko-Karyi Theatre, Cinema and Television University is the national university specializing exclusively in performing arts and located in Kyiv (Ukraine). It is a multidisciplinary institution that includes a department of theatrical arts and the Institute of Screen Arts. The university has four campuses around the city of Kyiv and a separate student dormitory. The acting rector of university is Inna Kocharian.

History
The institution was for the first registered in the Russian Ministry of the Internal Affairs on 5 March 1899, as a music-drama school, but only opened in September 1904. On 7 November 1912, the school was named in the memory of Mykola Lysenko who was its first director. The sponsorship came from Mykola Levytsky and Mykhailo Starytsky, a father-in-law of Ivan Steshenko. The school was opened in the building belonging to the professor-psychiatrist I. Sikorsky on the 15 Velyka Pidvalna street (today Yarslaviv Val). Upon the death of Mykola Lysenko the school chairman became O. Vonsovska, the school violin instructor, and then pianist Maryana Lysenko, the daughter of M.Lysenko.

In 1916-1917 the theatrical studio of Les Kurbas was opened at the institute. At the end of 1918 the chairman of artistic affairs and national culture Petro Doroshenko signed the document to transform the school into the Higher music-drama school of Mykola Lysenko. During 1919-1920 the first rector of the school was Felix Blumenfeld. 

Sometime during the Russian Civil War the Bolshevik government approved the request to move the school to 45 Velyka Volodymyrivska street (today it is the Palace of scientists of the National Academy of Sciences of Ukraine). 

The school was moved again to 52 Khreshchatyk, a place it rents to this day from the local municipal administration in 1922.  Mykola Hrinchenko was the rector of the school in 1924-1928.

The university was temporarily merged with the Russian Academy of Theatre Arts in Moscow during the occupation of Kyiv during World War II between 1941 and 1943.

Many graduates, teachers and students of the institute did not return from the war fronts. Their names are carved on memorial plaques installed in the 1960s in two different buildings of the Institute: on Yaroslavov Val Street, 40 and on Khreschatyk Street, 52. In November 1943, the Institute moved from Moscow to Kharkov, where a separate State Theater Institute, and in the summer of 1944 - reevacuated to Kiev.

The post-war period of the institute's history is marked by important events. He returned from Moscow with a slightly changed name: “Kiev State Institute of Theatrical Art”, and in 1945, on the occasion of the centenary of the birth of the outstanding Ukrainian playwright and theater figure I.K. Karpenko-Kary, the institute was named after him.

Since 1944, the institute began training specialists in the specialization "theater studies".

In 1961, a resolution was adopted by the Council of Ministers of the Ukrainian SSR on the establishment of a film faculty at the institute to train personnel in film directing, cinematography and film studies. In fact, in Ukraine, the training of personnel for cinematography was restored, which was artificially suspended due to the liquidation of the Institute of Cinematography in 1938. This faculty was located in the seventh building of the State Historical and Architectural Reserve "Kiev-Pechersk Lavra". Since 1997, the faculty has been housed in the buildings of the Kyiv film studio of chronicle and documentary films on Shchorsa Street, 18.

Since 1964, postgraduate and assistant courses have been functioning at the institute - internships.

In 1965, the institute was given the premises of the former Tereshchenko School of Economics at 40 Yaroslavov Val Street, but the educational process here was established after repairs in 1968. Then, after a long break, the educational theater resumed its work. And in 1986, the institute was provided with non-residential premises for an educational building on the street. Yaroslavskaya, 17/22. Started in 1986, the construction of a new building of the Institute on Lvovskaya Square was stopped in 1995 due to lack of public funds.

In the 1980-90s, for the first time in Ukraine, the institute opened specializations: “choreography”, “announcer and presenter of television programs”, “sound engineering”, “circus direction”, in 2003 - “actor of the puppet theater”.

By the Decree of the Cabinet of Ministers of Ukraine dated April 18, 2003, the Kiev State Institute of Theater Arts named after I.K. Karpenko-Kary was renamed into the Kiev State University of Theater, Film and Television named after I.K. Karpenko-Kary.

Now in the staff of the Kiev National University of Theater, Film and Television named after I.K. Karpenko-Kary among 188 full-time teachers - 11 doctors of science professors, 27 professors without a scientific degree of doctor of science, 67 candidates of science and associate professor, 14 people's artists, 20 honored figures arts, an honored worker of science and technology, 10 honored artists, three honored workers of culture, one honored worker of public education. 15 academicians, 12 corresponding members and one honorary full member of the Academy of Arts of Ukraine graduated from the university in different years, worked and are now working.

Today, the Kiev National University of Theatre, Film and Television is a highly professional educational institution that trains personnel in a whole arsenal of licensed creative specialties and specializations. Educational, methodological, research, professional training and education of future specialists is carried out at the university at two faculties - theatrical art and the art of cinema and television in full-time, evening and correspondence forms of education (in separate specializations). The organization of this work is carried out by the Academic Council of the University, the administration, three dean's offices, fourteen departments, an educational theater and an educational cinema and television complex.

Structure
 Institute of Screen Arts;
 Faculty of Theatrical Art;
 Extramural Studies Department (Distance education), under a dean.

University general departments 
 Department of stage speech;
 Department of musical training;
 Department of social studies;
 Department of philology.

Alumni
 Liudmyla Barbir
 Vladimir Bortko
 Boryslav Brondukov
 Elina Bystritskaya
 Olena Demyanenko
 Volodymyr Denshchykov
 Oksana Dmitriieva
 Maryna Dyachenko
 Ivan Mykolaychuk
 Nataliya Sumska
 Tamara Trunova
 Mykhailo Urytskyi
 Pavlo Zahrebelnyi
 Mykhaylo Melnyk

Faculty
 Anna Kostivna Lypkivska
 Vadim Skuratovsky

See also
 Kyiv Conservatory
 Lysenko music school
 Lviv Conservatory

References

External links
  

Culture universities in Ukraine
Film schools in Ukraine
Music schools in Ukraine
Universities and colleges in Kyiv
Shevchenkivskyi District, Kyiv
Culture in Kyiv
Educational institutions established in 1899
1899 establishments in the Russian Empire
1890s establishments in Ukraine
National universities in Ukraine
Institutions with the title of National in Ukraine